Sheelagh Nonie Gilbey (1953 Willesden, London) is a former presenter on several BBC children's TV programmes, including Play School, Play Away and Zig Zag. She also devised and appeared in the ITV series "Do It!", and played the leading part of Marianna in the 1981 film The Haunting of M directed by Anna Thomas. Gilbey also appeared as one of the celebrity contestants in the BBC's The Adventure Game. She currently teaches drama in Montessori nursery schools in west London.

Selected publications 
Gilbey, S., & Mansbridge, J. (1985). Do it. London: Methuen Children's.

References

External links

British television actresses
British television presenters
Living people
Date of birth missing (living people)
BBC television presenters
1953 births